Karosa LC 735 is a long-distance coach produced by bus manufacturer Karosa from the Czech Republic from 1983 to 1991. It was succeeded by Karosa LC 736 in 1991.

Construction features 
The Karosa LC 735 is a model of Karosa 700 series. The LC 735 is a modified version of the inter city bus models C 734 and C 735. The body is semi-self-supporting with frame and the engine with manual gearbox behind the rear axle. Only the rear axle is powered. The front axle is independent, while the rear axle is solid. All axles are mounted on air suspension. On the right side are two doors.
The front doors are hinged, while the rear doors (behind the rear axle) are single and usually serve only as an emergency exit. Comfortable adjustable leather seats are provided for passengers, distributed in 2 + 2 across a central aisle.  The seats are raised from the aisle height to provide a luggage compartment below, between the axles.  The luggage compartment has a volume of 5 m³. Above the seats are fitted mesh shelves for passenger hand luggage (unlike type LC 736, where the shelves are solid, and equipped with air vents above each seat). Near the front door is often placed a folding seat for a tour guide. The driver's cab is not separated from the rest of the vehicle.

Production and operation 
In the year 1983 started serial production, which continued until 1991.

Currently, number of Karosa LC 735 buses is decreasing, due to high age of buses.

Historical vehicles 
Private collections:
 Civic association for saving historic buses and trolleybuses Jihlava (1 bus)
 ŠKODA – BUS club Plzeň (1 bus, year 1983)
 Private collector (1 bus LC 735.20, license plate DO 34-05)
 Private collector (1 bus, ex TMT)
 Private collector (1 bus LC 735.00, located in Slovakia)
 Unknown owner (1 bus LC 735.00, license plate 7S1 4700)
 Unknown owner (1 bus LC 735.00 1, located in the Slovakia)
 Sokol Čechovice (1 bus LC 735.00)

See also 

 List of buses

Buses manufactured by Karosa
Buses of the Czech Republic
Vehicles introduced in 1983